The following is a list of usurpers in the Eastern Roman Empire or Byzantine Empire, from the start of the reign of Arcadius in 395 to the fall of Constantinople in 1453.

Usurper emperors 

The following is a listing of Byzantine emperors who rose to the throne due to their own initiative through a revolt or coup d'état.

 Basiliscus (r. 475–476)
 Phocas (r. 602–610)
 Heraclius (r. 610–641)
 Leontios (r. 695–698)
 Tiberios III (r. 698–705)
 Philippikos Bardanes (r. 711–713)
 Anastasios II (r. 713–715)
 Theodosios III (r. 715–717)
 Leo III the Isaurian (r. 717–741)
 Nikephoros I (r. 802–811)
 Leo V the Armenian (r. 813–820)
 Michael II (r. 820–829)
 Basil I (r. 867–886)
 John I Tzimiskes (r. 969–976)
 Isaac I Komnenos (r. 1057–1059)
 Nikephoros III Botaneiates (r. 1078–1081)
 Alexios I Komnenos (r. 1081–1118)
 Andronikos I Komnenos (r. 1183–1185)
 Isaac II Angelos (r. 1185–1195 and 1203–1204)
 Alexios III Angelos (r. 1195–1203)
 Alexios IV Angelos (r. 1203–1204)
 Alexios V Doukas (r. 1204)
 Andronikos III Palaiologos (r. 1328–1341)
 John VI Kantakouzenos (r. 1341–1354)
 Andronikos IV Palaiologos (r. 1376–1379)
 John VII Palaiologos (r. 1390)

Unsuccessful usurpers in the 5th and 6th centuries 

List of would-be emperors eventually defeated by the ruling sovereign, listed by reign. The noted date is the attempted usurpation.

Zeno: 474–491 
 Marcian (479) – Leo I's son–in–law, who resented the accession of Zeno. Captured the imperial palace but was in turn captured. Spent the rest of his life imprisoned in a fortress in Isauria.
 Leontius (484–488) – An Isaurian commander who was called on to put down the rebel Illus but declared himself emperor instead. He died after a four-year siege of the fortress of Papurius.

Anastasius I: 491–518 
 Longinus (491–492) – Brother of the Emperor Zeno, he launched a rebellion to enforce his claim to the throne but was defeated and fled to Egypt where he died.
 Areobindus (512) – Proclaimed emperor during a riot at Constantinople, but refused to accept the nomination.

Justin I: 518–527 
 Theocritus (518) – The comes domesticorum who attempted to buy support for the throne on the death of Anastasius I.

Justinian I: 527–565 
Julianus ben Sabar (529–531) – Leader of a Samaritan revolt, proclaimed "King of Israel". Managed to control the entire Samaria before being defeated.
 Hypatius (532) – A nephew of Anastasius I who was acclaimed emperor during the Nika riots.
 Stotzas (536–545) – A Byzantine soldier who was elected the leader of rebel troops in the recently conquered Vandal Kingdom of Africa. Aiming to establish a new kingdom, he was defeated on a number of occasions before finally being defeated and mortally wounded in 545.
 John Cottistis (537) – Usurper in Mesopotamia, he was an infantry soldier who was acclaimed emperor by his troops, but was killed after four days by imperial forces at Dara.

Unsuccessful usurpers in the 7th century

Heraclius: 610–641 
 Comentiolus (610–611) – the brother of Phocas, he refused to acknowledge Heraclius' accession and planned to enforce his claim to the throne. He was eventually assassinated.
 John of Conza (617) – described as a tyrannus (a term meaning usurper), he captured Naples but was defeated and killed by Eleutherius, the Exarch of Ravenna.
 Eleutherius (619) – the Exarch of Ravenna, he was a eunuch who set up his capital at Rome, but was murdered by his own troops.
 John Athalarichos (635) – The illegitimate son of Heraclius, he plotted to overthrow his father, but the scheme was uncovered prior to execution. He was mutilated and exiled.

Constans II: 641–668 
 Maurikios Chartoularios (642) – the dux of Rome, he attempted to establish an independent state in Italy. Executed by the Exarch of Ravenna.
 Valentinus (644) – the father–in–law of Constans II, he appeared at Constantinople with a contingent of troops, and demanded to be crowned emperor. He was overwhelmed by a hostile crowd and murdered.
 Gregory (646–647) – the Exarch of Carthage, his support of Chalcedonian orthodoxy pushed him into conflict with Constans. Killed in battle against the Arabs.
 Olympius (650–652) – the Exarch of Ravenna, he supported the Pope against Constans' religious policies. Marching into Sicily, he died of plague.
 Theodoros Pasagnathes (651–652) – a patrikios who rebelled in Armenia.
 Eleutherios (665–666) – the leader of a local rebellion that overthrew the exarch Gennadius in Carthage.
 Saborios (667–668) – the strategos of the theme of the Armeniacs, he raised a revolt in Anatolia, but died when his out of control horse smashed his head against a city gate.

Constantine IV: 668–685 
 Mizizios (668–669) – Commander of the Opsikion, he was chosen by the court at Sicily to replace the murdered Constans II. He was eventually executed by forces loyal to Constantine IV.

Unsuccessful usurpers in the 8th century

Justinian II: 685–695 and 705–711 
 Giorgius (710–711) – after the murder of the Exarch John III Rizocopo, Giorgius usurped imperial authority in Ravenna.

Leo III: 717–741 
 Basil Onomagoulos (718) – elevated as emperor in Sicily after hearing false news of the fall of Constantinople to the Arabs. Was surrendered to imperial officers when they arrived and then beheaded.
 Cosmas (727) – a commander of the army stationed in the theme of Hellas, he was elevated in opposition to Leo's iconoclast policies. Defeated while approaching Constantinople, Cosmas was captured and executed.
 Tiberius Petasius (729–730) – claimed imperial power in Italy in response to the iconoclasm controversy. Defeated and killed by Eutychius, the Exarch of Ravenna.
 Biseros (737) – usurper in Asia Minor, who took the name Tiberius.

Constantine V: 741–775 
 Artabasdos and Nikephoros (742–743) – count of the Opsikion theme and the brother–in–law of Constantine V, Artabasdos usurped the throne while Constantine was in Asia Minor. His son Nikephoros was made co–emperor with him at the same time. He reversed Constantine's iconoclast policies, but his armies were defeated. He was blinded and banished to a monastery.

Leo IV the Khazar: 775–780 
 Nikephoros (776) – Leo IV's half–brother, he attempted to usurp the throne, but was stripped of his rank when it was uncovered.

Constantine VI: 780–797 
 Nikephoros (780 and 792) – The eldest of Constantine V's surviving sons, Nikephoros was the focus of several pro-iconoclastic plots: in 780 he attempted to mount the throne after the death of Leo IV, but was prevented by Irene, and he was ordained a priest. Then in 792, some of the imperial tagmata proclaimed Nikephoros as emperor. He was captured by Constantine VI and blinded before being imprisoned in a monastery.
 Elpidios (782) – appointed strategos in Sicily, he was accused of disloyalty and refused to return to the capital, holding out against imperial forces sent to bring him back.

Irene: 797–802 
 Nikephoros (797 and 799) – Although blinded, Nikephoros was still involved in imperial conspiracies. In 797, he materialized in Hagia Sophia, hoping to inspire the populace to support his bid for the throne. It failed and he was banished to Athens. Then in 799, local troops planned to proclaim him emperor, but again it failed.
 Staurakios (799–800) – a eunuch who served Irene, he planned to usurp the throne after falling from favor, launching a revolt in Cappadocia. He died before the revolt was suppressed.

Unsuccessful usurpers in the 9th century

Nikephoros I: 802–811 
 Bardanes Tourkos (803) – the monostrategos in Anatolia, he used the army's discontent over Nikephoros' financial policies to declare himself emperor. Deserted by his commanders, and unable to obtain support in Constantinople he surrendered and was blinded.
 Arsaber (808) – a group of secular and ecclesiastic officials, who were dissatisfied with Nikephoros formed a conspiracy and acclaimed Arsaber, a nobleman holding the rank of patrikios, as emperor. The plot was discovered and Arsaber was tonsured and exiled to a monastery in Bithynia.

Michael I Rangabe: 811–813 
 Nikephoros (812) – for the sixth time, Nikephoros was involved in a plot for the imperial throne, this time with a group of disgruntled soldiers who tried to proclaim him emperor. The soldiers were disbanded and Nikephoros was moved to the island of Aphousia.

Michael II: 820–829 
 Thomas the Slav (821–823) – a bitter rival of Michael II, Thomas assumed the identity of Constantine VI and gathered an army. He besieged Constantinople, but was forced to retreat to Arkadiopolis where he surrendered. He was later executed.
 Euphemius (826–827) – a Byzantine admiral who killed the governor in Sicily and proclaimed himself emperor, forming an alliance with the Arabs. He died after a skirmish with imperial troops.

Theophilos: 829–842 
 Theophobos (838–839) – a Persian commander in the Byzantine army, his men acclaimed him emperor after the Battle of Anzen. Although he agreed to surrender, he was later executed.

Michael III: 842–867 
 Karbeas (843–863) – a Byzantine army officer, he established an independent Paulician state centered around Tephrike.

Basil I: 867–886 
 Chrysocheir (863–872) – the nephew of Karbeas, he succeeded his uncle but was defeated at the Battle of Bathys Ryax and executed.
 John Kourkouas (886) – leader of a wide-ranging conspiracy against Basil I, the plot was betrayed by his chamberlain.

Unsuccessful usurpers in the 10th century

Leo VI the Wise: 886–912 
 Andronikos Doukas (906–907) – the Domestic of the Schools, he disobeyed Leo's orders to join a military expedition and seized the fortress of Kaballa, near Iconium. Besieged, he fled to Baghdad with Arab help where he was later killed.

Constantine VII: 913–959 
 Constantine Doukas (913) – the son of Andronikos Doukas, he was approached by the Patriarch of Constantinople to take the throne to prevent the regency of Zoe Karbonopsina. He died during the attempt, thrown from his horse and killed by the imperial guards.
 Leo Phokas the Elder (919) – a former Domestic of the Schools, he attempted to prevent the accession of Romanos I Lekapenos, but was outmaneuvered and his revolt ended in failure. He was captured and blinded.
 Bardas Boilas (923) – the strategos of Chaldia, he rose in revolt against Romanos I Lekapenos.
 Basil the Copper Hand (932) – claiming to be Constantine Doukas, he launched a revolt in Bithynia but was captured and had his right hand amputated. He replaced his hand with a copper one and launched a second revolt, but it too failed. He was burned alive in the Forum Amastrianum.

Romanos II: 959–963
 Basil Peteinos (961) – a senior official under Constantine VII, whom he had helped to secure his throne against the Lekapenoi, Peteinos led a conspiracy involving several high-ranking members of the court, aiming to kill Romanos II and usurp the throne.

Nikephoros II: 963–969 
 Kalokyros (968–971) – a patrician who was dispatched to the court of Sviatoslav I of Kiev in order to persuade him to launch an invasion of the First Bulgarian Empire, with which Byzantium was at war. Sviatoslav agreed to support Kalokyros in his ambition of gaining the imperial throne, but Kalokyros was captured and executed.

John I Tzimiskes: 969–976 
 Leo Phokas the Younger (970) – The brother of Nikephoros II, he attempted to exert his claim to the throne in 970, but was exiled to Lesbos.

Basil II: 976–1025 
 Bardas Phokas the Younger (971 and 987–989) – Son of Leo Phokas the Younger, he launched a rebellion in 971 but was captured by Bardas Skleros. He was released from captivity to deal with Skleros, who had also rebelled, whom he defeated in 979. Returned to imperial favor, he was made doux of Antioch, but rebelled against Basil II after the emperor's defeat at the Battle of the Gates of Trajan. He died while charging at Basil in battle.
 Bardas Skleros (976–979 and 987–990) – the Domestic of the Schools in the East, he rebelled after the death of John I Tzimiskes, but was defeated in 979 by Bardas Phokas the Younger. He fled to Baghdad and returned after Basil's humiliation at Trajan's Gate. Seeking an accommodation with Bardas Phokas, he was captured but then released after Phokas' death. He surrendered himself to Basil II.
 Nikephoros Phokas Barytrachelos (1022) – the son of Bardas Phokas the Younger, rose in revolt with the support of Nikephoros Xiphias. The two men had a strained relationship, however, and the revolt quickly collapsed after Xiphias murdered Phokas.

Unsuccessful usurpers in the 11th century

Constantine VIII: 1025–1028 
 Constantine Bourtzes (1025) – was accused by the emperor of a conspiracy against his life and blinded.
 Nikephoros Komnenos (1025) – the governor of Vaspurakan, he was accused of plotting to overthrow Constantine and was blinded.
 Bardas Phokas (1026) – the grandson of Bardas Phokas the Younger, he was accused by the palace eunuchs of conspiracy and blinded.

Romanos III Argyros: 1028–1034 
 Constantine Diogenes (1029 and 1032) – the doux of Thessalonica, Bulgaria and Serbia, he was accused of conspiring against Romanos III, imprisoned and blinded. Then in 1032 he planned to take advantage of Romanos' absence on campaign in the East to escape to the Balkans and make a new bid to topple Romanos. The plot was discovered and Constantine committed suicide.
 Basil Skleros (1033) – Brother-in-law of Romanos III Argyros, he plotted against him and was exiled with his wife.

Michael IV the Paphlagonian: 1034–1041 
 Elpidios Brachamios (1034) – led a popular revolt at Antioch, which led to the arrest of Constantine Dalassenos
 Constantine Monomachos (1034 and 1038) – was twice accused of conspiracy against Michael IV, resulting in his exile to Lesbos.
 Vojislav of Duklja (1034 and 1040–1052) – organized a rebellion against Byzantine rule in 1034, but was captured and imprisoned in Constantinople. Upon his release he rebelled again, defeating a number of Byzantine armies and overthrowing imperial rule around the city of Dioklea.
 Basil Synadenos (1040) – the strategos of Dyrrhachium, he attempted to crush the rebellion of Peter Delyan but was accused by one of his army commanders of conspiracy against Michael IV and was arrested.
 Michael Keroularios (1040) – led an insurrection against Michael IV, but the plot was uncovered, and Michael became a monk to save his life.
 Gregory Taronites (1040) – a patrikios, he instigated a revolt in Phrygia, but was captured.
 Atenulf (1040–1042) – led a Lombard rebellion against Byzantine authority in southern Italy. Was bribed by the Byzantines and replaced as leader of the rebellion by Argyrus.
 Peter Delyan (1040–1041) – the leader of a local Bulgarian uprising against Byzantine rule, he was blinded by his cousin before being defeated by the Byzantines. He was taken to Constantinople and executed.

Constantine IX: 1042–1055 
 Argyrus (1042) – led the continuing Lombard revolt in southern Italy, but he too defected to the Byzantines, after being offered the position of Catepan of Italy.
 Theophilos Erotikos (1042) – the governor of Cyprus, he took advantage of the fall of Michael V to launch a rebellion. He was arrested and had his goods confiscated before being released.
 George Maniakes (1042–1043) – the Catepan of Italy, he was systematically reclaiming territory in Southern Italy when he was recalled to Constantinople. Furious, he rebelled, and although he destroyed an army sent to capture him, he was wounded during the battle and died.
 Stephanos Pergamenos (1043) – the sebastophoros, he rebelled in Byzantine Armenia.
 Leo Tornikios (1047) – Constantine IX's nephew and the strategos of Iberia, he proclaimed himself emperor at Adrianople and almost took the city of Constantinople. Forced to retreat, he was captured and blinded.
 Nikephoros Kampanares (1050) – a thematic judge and eparchos, he was banished by the emperor on suspicion of plotting to overthrow him, but was later recalled.
 Romanos Boilas (1051) – a senator and commander of the imperial bodyguard, he was a favourite of the emperor. He attempted to assassinate Constantine IX because he was in love with Constantine's mistress. The emperor pardoned him.
 Constantine Barys (1052) – He was exiled by Constantine IX for suspicion of plotting to take the throne. Whilst in exile he prepared to rebel against the emperor, and sought the advice of Saint Lazaros. The plot was discovered and he ended up losing his tongue.

Theodora: 1055–1056 
 Nikephoros Proteuon (1055) – the doux of Bulgaria, he was selected by Constantine IX to succeed him as he lay dying, but his elevation was pre-empted by Theodora, who banished him.

Michael VI Stratiotikos: 1056–1057 
 Theodosios Monomachos (1056) – another of Constantine IX Monomachos' nephews, he claimed the throne after the death of Theodora, but his revolt in Constantinople was easily suppressed.
 Nikephoros Bryennios (1057) – a Byzantine general. Furious at his treatment at the hands of Michael VI, he planned to launch a revolt, but he was arrested and blinded by officers loyal to the emperor.
 Hervé Frankopoulos (1057) – a Norman mercenary general, he attempted to establish his own state in eastern Asia Minor but was captured by the emir of Ahlat, Abu Nasr.

Michael VII Doukas: 1071–1078 
 Philaretos Brachamios (1071–1078) – On the death of Romanos IV Diogenes, he was acclaimed emperor by his troops and established an independent realm in Germanicia. He abandoned his imperial claims in 1078 in exchange for the title of doux of Antioch.
 Constantine Bodin (1072) – Leader of a revolt in Bulgaria, he was crowned Emperor of the Bulgarians under the name Peter III. He was captured and taken prisoner to Constantinople before being moved to Antioch.
 Roussel de Bailleul (1073 –1074)  – Frankish or Norman mercenary who was given command of 3,000 Frankish and Norman heavy cavalry. He used his cavalry to capture territory in Galatia, declared independence in 1073, sacked Chrysopolis, and defeated and army under John Doukas, before being defeated by Alexios Komnenos.
 John Doukas (1074) – Michael VII's uncle, he was sent to deal with the rebellion of some Norman mercenaries, but was defeated and captured. The Normans convinced him to become emperor, forcing Michael VII to appeal to the Seljuk Turks for aid. They defeated John Doukas and captured him.
 Nestor (1076–1078) – A former slave of Constantine X, he had been promoted to become the dux of Paristrion, on the region bordering the Danube. Having had much of his property and wealth confiscated by the minister Nikephoritzes, he rebelled in around 1076, placing himself at the head of the garrisons under his command, which were already in a state of mutiny due to arrears in their pay. The troops were eager to plunder the Bulgarians, and he obtained the assistance of one of the chiefs of the Patzinaks before marching onto Constantinople. The rebels demanded the dismissal of Nikephoritzes, but discovering that he did not have the numbers to attack the capital, his troops separated into smaller parties, and proceeded to plunder Thrace. Defeated by Alexios Komnenos in 1078, Nestor remained with the Patzinaks, and retreated with them back to Paristrion.
 Levon Davatanos (1077–1078) – the doux of Edessa, he launched an unsuccessful rebellion in the city.
 Nikephoros Bryennios (1077–1078) – a Byzantine general. News that Michael's chief minister, Nikephoritzes, had listed him for assassination, encouraged him to make his bid for the throne. He was beaten to the throne by Nikephoros III Botaneiates and defeated at Kalavrye by Alexios Komnenos.

Nikephoros III Botaneiates: 1078–1081 
 Konstantios Doukas (1078) – younger brother of Michael VII Doukas, he tried to assert his claim to the throne, but was handed over by the supporters of Nikephoros III, who banished him.
 Nikephoros Basilakes (1078) – the doux of Dyrrhachium, he proclaimed himself emperor before he too was defeated by Alexios Komnenos and blinded.
 Nikephoros Melissenos (1080–1081) – a Byzantine general, he opposed the elevation of Nikephoros Botaneiates, and promised more territory to the Seljuq Turks in exchange for their support. He abandoned his claim to the throne once Alexios Komnenos was proclaimed emperor.
 Ruben (1080–1095) – an Armenian general, he declared himself the independent ruler of the province of Cilicia.

Alexios I Komnenos: 1081–1118 
 Raiktor (1081) – an Eastern Orthodox monk who assumed the identity of Michael VII, and was used by the Norman Robert Guiscard to justify an attack on the Byzantine Empire.
 Constantine Humbertopoulos (1091) – of Norman descent, he was a mercenary captain whose decision to support Alexios, secured him the throne. He was promoted before conspiring against Alexios with an Armenian called Ariebes and was banished.
 Emir Tzachas of Smyrna (1092) – a Seljuk Turkish emir based in Smyrna who claimed the imperial title.
 John Komnenos (1092) – the doux of Dyrrhachium, he was accused by Theophylact of Bulgaria of plotting against the Emperor.
 Karykes (1093) – the governor of Crete, he launched a simultaneous revolt with Rhapsomates against Alexios. News of the imperial fleet's approach caused a counter-coup that overthrew him, during which he was murdered.
 Rhapsomates (1093) – the governor of Cyprus, he also rebelled against Alexios I. He defended Cyprus, but desertions in his ranks saw him attempt to flee, whereupon he was captured after seeking refuge in a church.
 Michael Taronites (1094) – Alexios' brother-in-law, he was convicted of conspiring against Alexios and banished.
 Pseudo-Constantine Diogenes (1094) – A pretender who claimed to be the dead son of Romanos IV Diogenes, Constantine led the Cumans who crossed the Balkan mountains and raided into eastern Thrace. He was killed at Adrianople.
 Nikephoros Diogenes (1094) – the son of Romanos IV Diogenes and a former co-emperor, he had been made governor of Crete by Alexios I. He attempted to murder Alexios twice, but both times he failed, the second time he was caught red-handed with the sword. He was blinded.
 Theodore Gabras (1096–1098) – the doux of Chaldia, achieved a level of semi-autonomy before Alexios I managed to reclaim some imperial control.
 Gregory Taronites (1104) – the doux of Chaldia, he tried to take advantage of his province's relative isolation by trying to make himself an independent ruler. Was defeated and captured.
 Michael Anemas (1105) – Along with his brothers and a senator named Salomon, he plotted against Alexios I, but the conspiracy was uncovered, resulting in Michael's imprisonment.
 Aron (1107) – The illegitimate descendant of a Bulgarian prince, he formed a plot to murder Alexios as he was encamped near Thessalonica, but the presence of the empress Irene and her attendants made this difficult. In an attempt to have her return to Constantinople, the conspirators produced pamphlets that mocked and slandered the empress, and left them in her tent. A search for the author of the publications uncovered the whole plot, resulting in Aron's banishment.
 Pseudo-Leo Diogenes (1116) – Another pretender claiming to be a son of Romanos IV Diogenes, he was the son-in-law of Vladimir II Monomakh, and attempted to overthrow Byzantine authority in Bulgaria.

Unsuccessful usurpers in the 12th century

John II Komnenos: 1118–1143 
 Cassianus (1126–1130) – the doux of Paphlagonia, he rebelled at the same time as Constantine Gabras. Frightened by John II's impending preparations to retake the rebellious provinces along the Black Sea, he ceded the province to Gazi Gümüshtigin, the emir of the Danishmend state.
 Constantine Gabras (1126–1140) – the doux of Chaldia, he ruled his province as a virtually autonomous state before John II managed to bring it back under direct imperial control.

Manuel I Komnenos: 1143–1180 
 Thoros (1145–1169) – a usurper in Cilicia, he escaped from imprisonment in Constantinople and re-established an independent Armenian Kingdom of Cilicia, which had been brought back under imperial control by John II Komnenos. He successfully repulsed a number of military expeditions launched by Manuel I.
 Andronikos Komnenos (1154) – a cousin of Manuel I, he plotted to overthrow Manuel with the support of King Géza II of Hungary who invaded the empire. Andonikos was arrested and confined by the emperor.
 Alexios Axouch (1167) – the grand-nephew of Manuel I and governor of Cilicia, he was accused of conspiring against the emperor and was confined to a monastery for the rest of his life.

Alexios II Komnenos: 1180–1183 
 Andronikos Kontostephanos (1182) – the megas doux and commander-in-chief of the Byzantine navy, he was a key supporter of Andronikos Komnenos, but began plotting against him once his tyrannical nature became apparent. He was captured and blinded.
 Andronikos Doukas Angelos (1183) – the father of Isaac II Angelos, he was a Byzantine general who had been sent to quell the rebellion of Andronikos I, but ended up joining the rebellion after being defeated in battle. Once Andronikos I became regent however, Andronikos Angelos entered into a conspiracy with the megas doux Andronikos Kontostephanos, the postal logothete and a number of other officials. He fled to the Kingdom of Jerusalem when Andronikos I uncovered the plot.
 John Komnenos Vatatzes (1183) – governor of the Thracesian theme, he objected to the rise of Andronikos Komnenos. He rebelled at Philadelphia and defeated the forces of Andronikos and Alexios II led by Andronikos Lampardas but died a few days later of natural causes.
 Theodore Angelos (1183–1184) - the son of Andronikos Doukas Angelos, he and his brother Isaac Angelos returned from Palestine and launched a rebellion at Nicaea against the regent Andronikos, prompting him to become co-emperor alongside Alexios II. In early 1184, Andronikos I captured Nicaea after Isaac surrendered the city to him. Andronikos then captured Theodore in Prusa, and had him blinded.

Andronikos I Komnenos: 1183–1185 
 Andronikos Lampardas (1183) – a Byzantine general, he rebelled when he heard news of Andronikos I's usurpation and murder of Alexios II Komnenos. Attempting to raise forces in Asia Minor, he was captured by officials loyal to Andronikos I and was blinded and soon afterwards killed.
 Theodore Kantakouzenos (1184) – the governor of Prussa, he attempted to assassinate Andronikos, but his horse stumbled during the attempt, throwing Theodore to the ground. He was beheaded by Andronikos' guard.
 Isaac Komnenos of Cyprus (1184–1191) – a minor member of the Komnenos family, he hired a troop of mercenaries and sailed to Cyprus with falsified letters commanding Byzantine officials to obey him. He was crowned emperor and brutally terrorised the island. He was eventually overthrown by Richard I of England, who captured Cyprus on his way to the Holy Land during the Third Crusade.
 Alexios Komnenos (1185) – the grandnephew of Manuel I Komnenos and his cup-bearer, he was banished by Andronikos Komnenos, but fled to the court of William II of Sicily. There, he obtained William's support for his claim to the throne, and William used this to launch a Norman invasion of the empire, culminating in the capture of Thessalonica.
 Alexios Komnenos (1185) – the illegitimate son of Manuel I Komnenos (as well as being Andronikos' son-in-law), he was promoted as emperor by the Sebastianus brothers, but Alexios was taken and blinded. He was later accused of conspiring with Andronikos Komnenos and forced to take Holy Orders.

Isaac II Angelos: 1185–1195 
 Andronikos Bryennios (1186) – the governor of Thessalonica, he was accused of conspiring with Alexios Komnenos to usurp the throne. He demanded the opportunity to refute the charges, but was blinded without a trial.
 Alexios Branas (1187) – a Byzantine general raised to the rank of protosebastos, he had defeated the Normans and had been sent to deal with the Vlach-Bulgarian Rebellion when he rebelled. He was defeated in battle by Conrad of Montferrat, Isaac II's brother-in-law and beheaded.
 Theodore Mangaphas (1188–1189 and 1204–1206) – the governor of Philadelphia, he declared himself emperor in 1188, forcing Isaac II to march out against him. Theodore agreed to relinquish the imperial title in exchange for retaining his position at Philadelphia. After the fall of Constantinople in 1204, he again claimed the imperial title, only to be overthrown by Theodore I Laskaris.
 Constantine Tatikios (1190) – achieved the support of 500 influential people to overthrow Isaac II, but was discovered, arrested and blinded.
 Basil Chotzas (1190–1204) – launched a rebellion and established a semi-autonomous state centred at Tarsia in north-western Anatolia.
 Constantine Aspietes (1190/91) – a Byzantine general, he objected to the way the war against the Vlach was proceeding and attempted to obtain support from the army. He was removed from command and blinded.
 Isaac Komnenos (1191) – incarcerated when his uncle Andronikos I Komnenos was overthrown, he escaped from prison and made a bid for the throne at Hagia Sophia. He was captured and tortured, dying the next day.
 Pseudo-Alexios II (1192) – a pretender claiming to be the dead son of Manuel I Komnenos, he obtained support from Sultan Kilij Arslan II and attacked Phrygia. He was assassinated by a priest.
 Pseudo-Alexios II (1192) – another royal pretender, he arose in Paphlagonia, but was defeated in battle by Theodore Choumnos, the chartularius, who captured and then put him to death.
 Constantine Angelos Doukas (1193) – Isaac II's cousin, success in the Bulgarian War saw him declare himself emperor. He was handed over to Isaac by his fellow officers and was blinded.

Alexios III Angelos: 1195–1203 
 Alexios Kontostephanos (1195 and 1200) – the former governor of Crete, after Isaac II's overthrow he was acclaimed emperor by the mob who declared their desire never to be ruled by the Komnenoi again. He was captured and imprisoned. He tried again in 1200, but was again unsuccessful.
 Pseudo-Alexios II (1196) – another pretender claiming to be the son of Manuel I Komnenos, he rose up at Nicomedia but was captured and blinded.
 Ivanko of Bulgaria (1198–1200) – after marrying Theodora Angelina and thus entering the imperial family, Ivanko rebelled in Thrace, capturing the general Manuel Kamytzes in 1198. He was taken prisoner during a meeting with the emperor's representative, Alexios Palaiologos.
 Dobromir Chrysos (1198–1202) – emerging in Macedonia and Thessaly, he also was offered marriage to Theodora Angelina to gain his allegiance. He fought against the emperor with the help of Manuel Camytzes, but was at last conquered by the Bulgarian emperor Kaloyan.
 Michael Kantakouzenos (1199) – arrested by Alexios III in 1195, he unsuccessfully declared himself emperor in 1199.
 John Komnenos the Fat (1201) – a relatively unimportant Byzantine noble, he had himself crowned emperor by a monk in Hagia Sophia and took control of the Great Palace. Alexios III struck back during the night, his forces recapturing the palace and beheading John Komnenos.
 Leo Chamaretos (1200–1206) – The proedros of Lacedaemonia, he established a breakaway regime in Laconia. He was eventually thrown out by the Venetians.
 Michael Komnenos Doukas (1200–1201) – The governor of the Theme of Mylasa and Melanoudion in Asia Minor, he rebelled but was defeated by Alexios III and forced to flee to the Seljuks. He eventually became the founder and first ruler of the Despotate of Epirus from 1205 until his death in 1215.
 Leo Sgouros (1201–1208) – governor of the area of Nauplia and the Argolid, he rebelled against Alexios III and established himself as an independent ruler. He expanded his territory throughout central Greece until confronted by the armies of the Franks. After a siege of five years he apparently committed suicide.
 John Spyridonakes (1201) – revolted against Alexios in southern Thrace.

Unsuccessful usurpers in the 13th century

Alexios IV Angelos: 1203–1204 
 Leo Gabalas (1203–1239) – governor of Rhodes, he established an independent principality on the island claiming the title of Caesar. He submitted to the suzerainty of the Empire of Nicaea in 1226, but remained in charge of the island until his death. He was succeeded by his son John Gabalas.
 Nikolaos Kanabos (1204) – proclaimed emperor by the people during the Fourth Crusade, he refused to leave the Hagia Sophia. He was killed by Alexios V Doukas soon after.

Theodore I Laskaris: 1204/5–1221 
 Manuel Maurozomes (1204–1206) – the illegitimate grandson of Manuel I Komnenos, he tried to establish a separate principality in Phrygia with the support of Sultan Kaykhusraw I.
 Sabas Asidenos (1204–1206) – a powerful local magnate who seized control of Sampson and the lower valley of the Maeander River. He eventually acknowledged the authority of Theodore Laskaris and the Empire of Nicaea.
 Theodore Gabras (1204–1208) – the independent archon of Amisos and the Pontus, his territory was soon incorporated into the Empire of Trebizond under Alexios I, who appointed him as governor of the region.
 David Komnenos (1204–1207) – the brother of Alexios I of Trebizond, he took possession of territory in Paphlagonia and the Pontus, but was under pressure from Theodore I Laskaris, forcing him in 1207 to acknowledge the Latin Empire's authority over his territory.
 John Kantakouzenos (1205–1209) – the archon of Methone, he established a breakaway regime at Messenia.
 Alexios Aspietes (1205) – the ruler (dynastes) of Philippopolis, he was proclaimed the leader of the town after the defeat of the Latin armies in the summer of 1205, and given the task of organizing the defences of the city against the advancing forces of Kaloyan of Bulgaria, who took the town.
 Theodore Branas (1205–1206) – the Lord of Adrianople, he established a breakaway state but was forced to accept the overlordship of the Latin Empire to protect the city from the ambitions of the Bulgarian emperor, Kaloyan.
 Theodore Komnenos Doukas (1215–1230) – the son of the sebastokrator John Doukas and of Zoe Doukaina, he was the half-brother of Michael I Komnenos Doukas and succeeded him in Epirus on his death. After his conquest of Thessalonica in 1224, he declared himself Byzantine Emperor. He was defeated and captured by Ivan Asen II of Bulgaria who blinded him.

John III Doukas Vatatzes: 1221–1254 
 Isaac Laskaris and Alexios Laskaris (1224) – the younger brothers of Theodore Laskaris, they resented the accession of John III and offered their services to the Latin Emperor. With the help of the Latins, they attempted to overthrow John III but were defeated in battle, taken captive and blinded.
 Andronikos Nestongos and Isaac Nestongos (1224) – the cousins of John III, they attempted to overthrow the emperor and place Andronikos as emperor with the support of a significant number of Byzantine nobles. The plot was uncovered, but Andronikos managed to escape to the Seljuk Turks.
 Manuel Komnenos Doukas (1230–1237) – the brother of Theodore Komnenos Doukas, he took over the rule of the Empire of Thessalonica after the capture of his brother, although de facto a powerless Bulgarian vassal. He was overthrown when his brother returned from captivity and fled to the east. He returned in 1239 and set himself up as the ruler of Thessaly until his death.
 John Komnenos Doukas (1237–1242) – son of Theodore Komnenos Doukas, installed by him as Emperor of Thessalonica after he overthrew his brother Manuel in 1237. In 1242 he was forced to renounce the title of Emperor for that of Despot by Vatatzes.
 John Gabalas (1239–1250)  – the brother of Leo Gabalas, he took over rule of the island of Rhodes on his brother's death, but by 1250 had submitted to the authority of the emperor at Nicaea.

Michael VIII Palaiologos: 1259–1282 
 Pseudo-John IV Laskaris (1262) – the treatment of John IV Laskaris by Michael VIII saw an uprising occur at Nicaea under a pretender who claimed he was the boy, forcing Michael to drag out the real John IV to disprove the pretender's claims.
 John Doukas (1280) – the Ruler of Thessaly, he was appointed sebastokrator by Michael VIII, but the alliance between the two was always uneasy. He became the champion of the anti-union forces, and in 1280 he nominated himself as the Orthodox emperor of the empire, but Michael was able to hold on to power.

Andronikos II Palaiologos: 1282–1328 
 Constantine Palaiologos (1292) – the son of Michael VIII Palaiologos, his status as porphyrogennetos saw him attempt to assert a claim to the throne in 1292.
 Alexios Philanthropenos (1295) – a Byzantine general, he was the doux of the Thracesian Theme. His troops proclaimed him emperor after achieving some victories over the Turks. He was eventually taken prisoner during negotiations with Andronikos II and blinded.
 John Drimys (1305) – a would-be priest from Epirus, he claimed to be descended from the Laskarid emperors, and tried to overthrow Andronikos II. He was arrested.
 John Komnenos Palaiologos (1326–1327) – the son of Constantine Palaiologos, he was the governor of Thessalonica when he decided to take advantage of the civil war raging between Andronikos II and Andronikos III Palaiologos by declaring the independence of his province. He died soon afterwards.

Unsuccessful usurpers in the 14th and 15th centuries

Andronikos III Palaiologos: 1328–1341 
 Syrgiannes Palaiologos (1333–1334) – the governor of Thessalonica, he was suspected of plotting for the throne when he was adopted by Maria, the mother of Andronikos III in 1333. He fled to the court of the Serbian king, Stephen Dušan, who gave him a large Serbian army. He invaded the empire but was eventually murdered.

John V Palaiologos: 1341–1391 
 Nikephoros II Orsini (1339–1340 and 1356–1359) – refused the position of a Byzantine vassal in Epirus, Nikephoros attempted to rule in Epirus with the help of Catherine of Valois, the titular Latin Empress of Constantinople. He was defeated and persuaded to surrender by John Kantakouzenos. After the fall of John Kantakouzenos, with whom he was allied, he set himself up in Thessaly, taking advantage of the death of Stephen Uroš IV Dušan of Serbia. He died while fighting the Albanians.
 Michael Gabrielopoulos (1342) – related to the former sebastokrator Stephen Gabrielopoulos, he claimed to be the hereditary lord of the area around Trikala in Thessaly, but was ousted by a governor sent by John VI Kantakouzenos.
 Stephen Uroš IV (1346–1355) – the ruler of Serbia, he claimed the title of Emperor (Tsar) of the Serbs and Romans in 1346 until his death.
 Matthew Kantakouzenos (1354–1357) – the son of John VI Kantakouzenos, based in Thrace, he fought with John V after the abdication of his father for the throne. He was eventually captured and was forced to move to the Morea.
 Stephen Uroš V (1355–1371) – the son of Stephen Uroš IV, he too claimed the title of Emperor, although much of his territory was lost to various nobles and the Turks.
 John Limpidarios (1356) – the captain of Nikephoros Orsini's fleet, he took advantage of Nikephoros' absence to attack Ainos, and gained control of the city. He was eventually thrown out of the city.
 Simeon Uroš (1356–1370) – appointed governor of Epirus and Thessaly by Stephen Uroš IV Dušan of Serbia, he was thrown out by Nikephoros II Orsini, after which he declared himself Emperor of the Serbs and Romans in 1356. He established himself in Thessaly which he controlled till his death.
 Thomas Preljubović (1366–1382) – he attempted to usurp authority in Epirus, forcing Simeon Uroš to recognise him as the ruler in exchange for Thomas recognising Simeon as his suzerain. He was recognised in 1382 by John V with the title of despotes.
 Andronikos Palaiologos (1373 and 1384) – the son of John V, he plotted to murder his father in 1373, but it was uncovered, resulting in Andronikos losing one of his eyes. He again rebelled in 1384, and was driven into exile at Selymbria.

Manuel II Palaiologos: 1391–1425 
 Theodosios Kyprios (fl. c. 1414) – alleged to harbor imperial ambitions by the writer Mazaris ("even in his dreams he wears the white imperial robes").

John VIII Palaiologos: 1425–1448 
 Demetrios Palaiologos (1442 and 1448) – the brother of John VIII, he claimed the throne in 1442 based on his status as a porphyrogennetos. Although he attempted to harness the anti-Catholic opposition to John, he was abandoned by his army and exiled at Selymbria. He again attempted to usurp the throne in 1448 once John VIII died, but was opposed by his mother, who supported the claim of Constantine XI Palaiologos.

See also 

 List of Byzantine civil wars

References 

 List
Civil wars of the Byzantine Empire
Usu